Shooting Range is a video game for the Nintendo Entertainment System published by Bandai in 1989.

Summary
This video game involves mini-games resembling the Old West; with the exception being the moon level because people did not land on the moon until the 1960s. The objective is simple: shoot the red and white targets on the character's heads and watch your energy level. It also includes a carnival-style game where you shoot glass bottles in a saloon. The game uses the NES Zapper for controls.

References

1989 video games
Bandai games
Light gun games
Nintendo Entertainment System games
Nintendo Entertainment System-only games
North America-exclusive video games
Tose (company) games
Video games developed in Japan
Western (genre) video games